Athletics competitions at the 1979 South Pacific Games were held in Suva, Fiji, between August 29 - September 8, 1979.

A total of 37 events were contested, 22 by men and 15 by women.

Medal summary
Medal winners and their results were published on the Athletics Weekly webpage
courtesy of Tony Isaacs and Børre Lilloe, and on the Oceania Athletics Association webpage by Bob Snow.

Complete results can also be found on the Oceania Athletics Association webpage.

Men

Women

Medal table (unofficial)

Participation (unofficial)
Athletes from the following 16 countries were reported to participate:

 
 
 
 
 
 
 

 
 
 Northern Mariana Islands

References

External links
Pacific Games Council
Oceania Athletics Association

Athletics at the Pacific Games
International athletics competitions hosted by Fiji
South Pacific Games
1979 in Fijian sport
1979 Pacific Games